Adapisoriculidae is an extinct family of non-placental eutherian mammals present during the Paleogene and possibly the Late Cretaceous. They were once thought to be members of the order Erinaceomorpha,
closely related to the hedgehog family (Erinaceidae), because of their similar dentition, or to be basal Euarchontans. They were also thought to be marsupials at one point. Most recent studies show them to be non-placental eutherians, however.

They were small mammals of about 15 cm long, with a tail of equal length. They were probably nocturnal, eating insects and fruits.

Deccanolestes and Sahnitherium from the Late Cretaceous of India may be Cretaceous members of Adapisoriculidae.

References

Prehistoric eutherians
Prehistoric mammal families
Paleocene mammals
Eocene mammals
Paleocene first appearances
Eocene extinctions